Arzuiyeh County is in Kerman province, Iran. The capital of the county is the city of Arzuiyeh. At the 2006 census, the region's population (as Arzuiyeh District and Dehsard Rural District of Baft County) was 40,386 in 9,078 households. The district and rural district were separated from the county in 2011 to form Arzuiyeh County. The following census in 2011 counted 41,979 people in 10,899 households. At the 2016 census, the county's population was 38,510 in 11,142 households.

Administrative divisions

The population history and structural changes of Arzuiyeh County's administrative divisions over three consecutive censuses are shown in the following table. The latest census shows two districts, five rural districts, and one city.

References

 

Counties of Kerman Province